Aidan Walsh (born  March 28, 1997) is an Irish boxer.

Walsh trains at Emerald ABC, Belfast.

In 2015, Aidan won gold at light welterweight at the Commonwealth Youth Games.

At welterweight, Aidan won silver at the 2018 Commonwealth Games.
Aidan also competed in the 2022 Commonwealth Games in Birmingham where he won Gold alongside his sister Michaela Walsh, who is also a champion amateur boxer.

Walsh competed in the men's welterweight competition at the Tokyo 2020 Olympics and won a bronze medal.

References

External links
 
 
 
 

Living people
1997 births
Male boxers from Northern Ireland
Irish male boxers
Commonwealth Games medallists in boxing
Commonwealth Games silver medallists for Northern Ireland
Boxers at the 2018 Commonwealth Games
Welterweight boxers
Light-middleweight boxers
Boxers at the 2020 Summer Olympics
Olympic boxers of Ireland
Medalists at the 2020 Summer Olympics
Olympic medalists in boxing
Olympic bronze medalists for Ireland
Boxers at the 2022 Commonwealth Games
Commonwealth Games gold medallists for Northern Ireland
Medallists at the 2018 Commonwealth Games
Medallists at the 2022 Commonwealth Games